The University of Franche-Comté (UFC) is a pluridisciplinary public French university located in Besançon, Franche-Comté, with decentralized campuses in Belfort, Montbéliard, Vesoul and Lons-le-Saunier.

It is a founding member of the community of universities and institutions University of Burgundy - Franche-Comté (COMUE UBFC), headquartered in Besançon and which federates universities and other higher learning institutes in the Bourgogne-Franche-Comté region.

With 28 research labs, 667 PhD students and 788 research professors in 2016–2017, the University of Franche-Comté is well represented in the research community. It collaborates with many organizations (University Hospital of Besançon, CNRS, INSERM, CEA, etc.).

It has about 29,000 students, including nearly a third of scholarship students and 12% of foreign students. Its Centre for Applied Linguistics (CLA) is one of the world's leading schools for teaching French as a foreign language and French linguistics.

History
The university was founded in 1423 in Dole, at that time in the Duchy of Burgundy. It was moved to Besançon in 1691 as Dole was being punished for having resisted too long against the king of France Louis XIV during his conquest of the region.

Research centres

The Centre for Applied Linguistics (CLA) of the University of Franche-Comté ranks among the top language teaching institutions in the world. The CLA has research contacts in more than 110 countries, and partners with the French Ministry of Education and the Ministry of Foreign Affairs.

The Centre of Distance Teaching (CTU) allow to people who are working to continue to study in different matters like history, informatics, mathematics, AEG, etc.

Much of the international visibility in pure and applied science at the University of Franche-Comté comes through the CNRS FEMTO-ST with its expertise in numerous fields, including physics, optics, mechanics, time-frequency, microsystems and nanotechnology.

Research about Wikipedia
In 2015, Dr José Lages of the University of Franche-Comté and Dima Shepelyansky of Paul Sabatier University in Toulouse published a global university ranking based on Wikipedia scholarly citations.

Notable scholars and alumni

Notable professors
Louis Bachelier, mathematician, founder of financial mathematics.
Robert Badinter, activist and criminal lawyer.
Georges Duby, mediaeval historian.
Olivier Duhamel, politician.
Felix Gaffiot, author of Dictionnaire Illustré Latin-Français.
Corine Pelluchon, philosopher.
Louis Rougier, philosopher.
Henri Étienne Sainte-Claire Deville, chemist known for his work with aluminium.

Alumni
Yukiya Amano, Japanese diplomat.
Jean-Luc Lagarce, actor and director.
Claude Lorius, glaciologist.
Yves Jégo, politician.
Jean-Luc Mélenchon, politician.
Abdellatif Miraoui, Moroccan Minister of Higher Education, Scientific Research and Innovation.
Hubert-Félix Thiéfaine, pop-rock singer.
Abdoulaye Wade, President of Senegal (2000–2012)
Viviane Wade, French-born First Lady of Senegal (2000–2012)

References

Points of interest
 Centre for Applied Linguistics
 Jardin botanique de Besançon

See also 
 List of early modern universities in Europe
 List of public universities in France by academy

 
Buildings and structures in Besançon
Buildings and structures in Doubs
Buildings and structures in Jura (department)
Buildings and structures in Haute-Saône
Universities in Bourgogne-Franche-Comté
Educational institutions established in the 15th century
1420s establishments in the Holy Roman Empire
1621 establishments in France
Education in Belfort
Education in Montbéliard
Vesoul
Lons-le-Saunier
Universities and colleges in Besançon
1423 establishments in Europe